This place has closed
The Ruth Funk Center for Textile Arts is a museum in Melbourne, Florida, located in Brevard County. It is part of Florida Institute of Technology and exhibits textiles, clothing and accessories.

Opened in 2009, the Center features an international collection of historical and contemporary textiles, embroidery, clothing, lace, samplers and accessories from North America, Europe, Africa, Japan, India and Central Asia. The collection also includes contemporary wearable art and fiber arts.

The museum is named after its founding benefactor, Ruth E. Funk, an artist and designer, who donated funds and her collection of international textiles to the museum in 2006.

References

External links
Ruth Funk Center for Textile Arts website

Museums in Brevard County, Florida
Buildings and structures in Melbourne, Florida
Florida Institute of Technology
Textile museums in the United States
University museums in Florida
2009 establishments in Florida
Museums established in 2009